Seller Glacier is a well-defined glacier, 20 nautical miles (37 km) long and 4 nautical miles (7 km) wide flowing westward into Forster Ice Piedmont, western Antarctic Peninsula, just north of Flinders Peak. Roughly surveyed by British Graham Land Expedition (BGLE), 1936–37, and resurveyed by Falkland Islands Dependencies Survey (FIDS) in December 1958.

Named by United Kingdom Antarctic Place-Names Committee (UK-APC) after John Seller (about 1630-1698), English hydrographer and compass maker who published the first sailing directions for England, 1671; his The variation of the compass, with rules for its determination.

References

Glaciers of Fallières Coast